Salley is a town in Aiken County, South Carolina, United States. The population was 398 at the 2010 census. It is part of the Augusta, Georgia metropolitan area. Salley is known for hosting the Chitlin Strut, a town-wide festival, every November.

History
The Salley Historic District was listed on the National Register of Historic Places in 2000. Salley elected Ladonna Hall as mayor on November 5, 2019. Mayor Hall was the first African American and first Woman elected to this position in the town's history.  The incumbent Mayor unsuccessfully challenged those results.

Geography

Demographics

As of the census of 2000, there were 410 people, 165 households, and 110 families residing in the town. The racial makeup of the town was 49.27% African American, 46.83% White, 1.71% Native American, 0.98% Asian, and 1.22% from two or more races. Hispanic or Latino of any race were 0.24% of the population.

There were 165 households, out of which 26.1% had children under the age of 18 living with them, 40.0% were married couples living together, 21.8% had a female householder with no husband present, and 33.3% were non-families. 30.3% of all households were made up of individuals, and 17.6% had someone living alone who was 65 years of age or older. The average household size was 2.48 and the average family size was 3.10.

In the town, the population was spread out, with 22.9% under the age of 18, 8.8% from 18 to 24, 26.1% from 25 to 44, 22.2% from 45 to 64, and 20.0% who were 65 years of age or older. The median age was 40 years. For every 100 females, there were 83.9 males. For every 100 females age 18 and over, there were 80.6 males.

The median income for a household in the town was $28,750, and the median income for a family was $41,250. Males had a median income of $39,063 versus $18,661 for females. The per capita income for the town was $12,250. About 28.6% of families and 28.4% of the population were below the poverty line, including 46.1% of those under age 18 and 36.1% of those age 65 or over.

References

External links
 The official Facebook page for the Town of Salley, SC.
 A History of the Town of Salley, featured in the website for the Town's Chitlin Strutt festival.
 Salley Southern Railroad Depot - Salley, S.C.

Towns in Aiken County, South Carolina
Towns in South Carolina
Augusta metropolitan area